The Master and Servant Act 1889 (52 & 53 Vict c 24) is an Act of the Parliament of the United Kingdom.

The Schedule to this Act was repealed by the Statute Law Revision Act 1908 (8 Edw 7 c 49).

This Act was repealed by section 1(1) of, and Part XIX of Schedule 1 to, the Statute Law (Repeals) Act 1977.

This Act was repealed for the Republic of Ireland by sections 2(1) and 3(1) of, and Part 4 of Schedule 2 to, the Statute Law Revision Act 2007.

See also
Master and Servant Act
Statute Law Revision Act

References
Halsbury's Statutes,
The Public General Acts passed in the fifty-second and fifty-third years of the reign of Her Majesty Queen Victoria. HMSO. London. 1889. Pages 75 to 78.

External links
List of amendments and repeals in the Republic of Ireland from the Irish Statute Book

United Kingdom Acts of Parliament 1889
July 1889 events